This is a list of lakes in Croatia. The table lists some lakes with an area of 0.2 km2 or bigger, sorted by size.

(* denotes artificial lake)

See also
 Lake Bačica
 Lake Banova
 Lake Baštica
 Lake Crveno
 Lake Kuti
 Lake Lepenica
 Lake Modro
 Lake Novska
 Lake Omladin
 Lake Ričice
 Lake Šoderica
 Lake Tribalj
 Lake Zeleno

See also

References

External links

Croatia
Lakes